The minister of public services and procurement is the minister of the Crown in the Canadian Cabinet who is responsible for overseeing the Government of Canada's "common service organization" (Public Services and Procurement Canada), an expansive department responsible for the internal servicing and administration of the federal government. A flavour for the department is given by the list of acts and regulations for which it is responsible. 

The minister of public services and procurement is also the receiver general for Canada. The Department of Public Works and Government Services Act, 1996 states: "In the Minister's capacity as Receiver General, the Minister shall exercise all the powers and perform all the duties and functions assigned to the receiver general by law."

The current minister is Helena Jaczek, who took over on August 31, 2022, from Filomena Tassi.

List of ministers

Key:

Prior to 1996, the responsibilities of the current Public Works and Government Services portfolio were divided between the now-defunct posts of Minister of Public Works and Minister of Supply and Services.

Acts for which the minister is responsible

    Anti-Personnel Mines Convention Implementation Act
    Bridges Act
    Canadian Arsenals Limited Divestiture Authorization Act
    Defence Production Act
    Department of Public Works and Government Services Act
    Dry Dock Subsidies Act
    Expropriation Act
    Federal District Commission to have acquired certain lands, An Act to confirm the authority of the
    Garnishment, Attachment and Pension Diversion Act
    Government Property Traffic Act
    Kingsmere Park Act
    National Flag of Canada Manufacturing Standards Act
    Ottawa River, An Act respecting certain works
    Payments in Lieu of Taxes Act
    Pension Benefits Division Act
    Publication of Statutes Act
    Seized Property Management Act
    Shared Services Canada Act
    Surplus Crown Assets Act
    Translation Bureau Act

Source:

References

External links 
 

Public Services and Procurement